{{Infobox person
| name               = Phaedra Parks
| image              =
| caption            = Parks at the Kentuky Derby 2019
| birth_name         = Phaedra Creonta Parks
| birth_date         = 
| birth_place        = Athens, Georgia, U.S.
| education          = Wesleyan College (BA)University of Georgia (JD)
| occupation         = 
| known_for          = The Real Housewives of AtlantaThe Real Housewives Ultimate Girls TripMarried to Medicine
| years_active       = 2001–present
| spouse             = 
| children           = 2
}}

Phaedra Creonta Parks (born October 26, 1973) is an American television personality, attorney, mortician, businesswoman, author and actress. She is best known for appearing on Bravo's The Real Housewives of Atlanta from 2010 until 2017. Prior to this, she was an established attorney, fronting her own legal firm, The Parks Group. In June 2022, she starred on the second season of The Real Housewives Ultimate Girls Trip on Peacock.

Early life
Parks was born in Athens, Georgia, where RHOA co-star NeNe Leakes also lived, and attended the same high school as Leakes. She is one of four children to pastor parents Regina Bell and Henry Parks. Before undertaking a Juris Doctor at the University of Georgia, she attended the London School of Economics (LSE) and Wesleyan College and graduated with a Bachelor of Arts degree with honours.

Career
Parks first appeared on The Real Housewives of Atlanta in 2010. She was already an established attorney, with her own legal practice, The Parks Group. Throughout her career, she had represented multiple public figures such as Bobby Brown. In 2006, she was awarded 'Attorney of the Year' and has served on Georgia's Law School Alumni Council, the Grammy Recording Board, UGA Law School Board, and G-Capp. She has served as a legal analyst on shows like Fox News and NBC regarding the Michael Jackson trial. Parks has also acted as a television producer for BET's The Tiny and Toya Show.

Her appearance on The Real Housewives of Atlanta helped her become nominated as one of Atlanta's top 100 Black women of influence, as her season 3 debut kick-started high publicity and positive attention for Parks. Her seven season stint on the show saw Parks involved in multiple main storylines including the dissolution of her marriage to Apollo Nida and pregnancies resulting in sons Ayden and Dylan. In a 2011 episode of RHOA, Parks announced her plan to become a mortician. Parks was ultimately fired ahead of the show's tenth season following a damaging rumour she circulated about fellow RHOA cast member Kandi Burruss and her husband, Todd Tucker. Following her departure from RHOA, Bravo tentatively announced a new unscripted series focussed on Parks alone titled, Rich People's Problems. The show was never released.

In 2013, Parks released her first book, Secrets of the Southern Belle: How to Be Nice, Work Hard, Look Pretty, Have Fun and Never Have an Off Moment. In 2020, Parks and then-boyfriend, Medina Islam, appeared on the season two premiere of Marriage Boot Camp: Hip Hop Edition She made her acting debut in Covenant, an eight-episode anthology series on Allblk, in October 2021. She played Bernice Whitfield, the family matriarch. In 2021, it was announced that Parks would be appearing on the second season of The Real Housewives Ultimate Girls Trip, the franchise's 'mash-up' series produced by Peacock featuring multiple well-known housewives from the franchise. 

In 2022, alongside Parks' RHUGT main cast appearance, she additionally stars in a recurring guest role in The Real Housewives of Dubai's first season, as a friend of housewife Caroline Brooks.  Shereé Whitfield stated that Parks filmed for Season 14 of RHOA at her fashion show, however scenes featuring Parks were never aired. Rumours regarding Parks' return to RHOA in a full-time capacity have begun to swirl following executive producer Andy Cohen stating he would love to have her back, following her 2017 firing. Reportedly, her appearances on RHUGT, RHOA and RHODXB are to test whether her Bravo comeback appeals to audiences. Kandi Burruss has stated she would leave RHOA if Parks returns. In January 2023, it was announced that Parks would return for the fourth season of The Real Housewives Ultimate Girls Trip, set to film in Morocco later that month. Parks has signed onto the upcoming tenth season of Married to Medicine'', replacing Dr. Contessa Metcalfe and Anila Sajja.

Personal life 
Between 2009 and 2017, Parks was married to Apollo Nida. Nida was convicted of conspiracy to commit mail, wire, and bank fraud, but Parks has maintained she had no knowledge of his criminal activity. With Nida, she has two children: Ayden (born 2010) and Dylan (born 2013). She dated Medina Islam before breaking up in 2021. She is dating an unnamed doctor in the Atlanta area.

References

African-American lawyers
African-American women lawyers
African-American television personalities 
Georgia (U.S. state) lawyers
The Real Housewives of Atlanta
The Real Housewives cast members
People from Athens, Georgia
People from Atlanta
Living people
Wesleyan College alumni
University of Georgia alumni
1973 births